Raptor is a 2001 American direct-to-video horror film directed by Jim Wynorski, produced by Roger Corman, and starring Eric Roberts, Melissa Brasselle, and Corbin Bernsen. It re-uses dinosaur footage from the Corman-produced Carnosaur film series, edited together with original footage shot by Wynorski. Raptor was produced by Corman's company New Concorde, which had worked on the Carnosaur films.

Plot
When a series of unexplained vicious animal attacks strikes his community, Sheriff Jim Tanner and his assistant Barbara trace them back to a Dr. Hyde, a former military researcher whose government funding for a dinosaur cloning project was cut. When the Pentagon discovers Hyde obtained foreign backing to continue his experiments, they send in a strike team to save Tanner and Barbara and stop Hyde.

Cast
 Eric Roberts as Sheriff Jim Tanner	
 Melissa Brasselle as Barbara Phillips
 Corbin Bernsen as Dr. Frank Hyde
 Tim Abell as Captain Connelly 
 William Monroe as Captain York
 Lorissa McComas as Lola Tanner, Sheriff Tanner's Daughter 
 Frank Novak as Lyle Shell
 Bruce Nozick as FBI Agent
 Harrison Page as Deputy
 Grant Cramer as McCoy, Hyde's Henchman
 Brian Lynn Graham as The Coroner
 GiGi Erneta as Henderson

Reception
Psychotronic Video wrote that the dinosaur effects "are as painfully awful" as the Carnosaur films. Riley Black, writing for Smithsonian in 2011, criticized the film's recycled footage for its lack of continuity.

References

External links
 
 Raptor at TCMDB
 Raptor at Letterbox DVD

2001 horror films
Mad scientist films
2001 films
2000s monster movies
Films directed by Jim Wynorski
Films about dinosaurs
Films produced by Roger Corman
American horror films
2000s English-language films
2000s American films
English-language horror films